Kataxenna Kamillia Kova (born Katarzyna Kamillia Kova; 14 February 1985) is an English fetish and glamour model, best known for her latex, glamour, and pin-up modelling. She was nominated to be part of AskMen's "Top 10 Modern Fetish models", being the only British entrant.

Early life and education 
Kataxenna Kova was born in Enfield, north London and grew up in Southgate. She is of Russian, Italian, and Polish descent. She was recognised for her toned athletic curves and her small waist during her late teens, which led to her working as a fitness model.

Career 
Kataxenna Kova's style consists of pin-ups in a modern/vintage style, Playboy style glamour, and Dark Vixen fetish. She had natural breasts until 2006, when an operation took her from a natural large C cup to a DD. She has modelled for companies such as House of Harlot, Lady Lucie Latex, FairyGothMother, Torture Garden, Liberation, Libidex, Loaded Magazine, Deisoulle, Playboy Europe, Metal Hammer, and Classic Rock. She has also modelled for US company Action Girls, which helped to popularise notable models such as Veronika Zemanova. She was the centrefold in Metal Hammer UK's "Maidens of Metal" 2010 calendar. In July 2015, she was featured on the cover of Femme Rebelle Magazine.

She is also an actress, and in 2006 starred in her first lead film role in horror B-movie FrightWorld. Her first screen work goes back to her childhood but she chose to pursue music over acting during that time.

References

External links 
 Official Website
 Kataxenna at Model Mayhem
 

English female adult models
Living people
1985 births
English people of Russian descent
English people of Italian descent
English people of Polish descent